State Route 642 (SR 642) in the U.S. state of Virginia is a secondary route designation applied to multiple discontinuous road segments among many counties. The list below describes the sections in each county that are designated SR 642.

List

References

External links

642